The Belarus national beach soccer team represents Belarus in international beach soccer competitions and is controlled by the BFF, the governing body for football in Belarus.

After the 2022 Russian invasion of Ukraine, UEFA, the European governing body for football, banned Belarus from hosting international competitions.

Results and fixtures

The following is a list of match results in the last 12 months, as well as any future matches that have been scheduled.

Legend

2021

Players

Current squad
The following players and staff members were called up for the 2021 FIFA Beach Soccer World Cup.

Head coach:  Nicolás Caporale
Goalkeeping coach:  Aliaksandr Zhamoitsin

Competitive record

FIFA Beach Soccer World Cup

Honours
FIFA Beach Soccer World Cup qualifying tournament best: 3rd
2019
Euro Beach Soccer League best: 5th place
2016, 2018

References

External links
Belarus at FIFA
Belarus at BSWW
Belarus at Beach Soccer Russia

European national beach soccer teams
Beach Soccer